The 1902 All-Ireland Senior Football Championship Final was the fifteenth All-Ireland Final and the deciding match of the 1902 All-Ireland Senior Football Championship, an inter-county Gaelic football tournament for the top teams in Ireland.

Dublin won easily; they led 2-6 to 0-0 at half-time and relaxed in the second half.

Dublin were represented by their senior club champions of 1901, Bray Emmets (despite their being located in County Wicklow).

It was the second of five All-Ireland football titles won by Dublin in the 1900s.

References

Gaelic football
All-Ireland Senior Football Championship Finals
Dublin county football team matches
London county football team matches